Jens Petter Stang (born 28 November 1977) is a retired Norwegian football player.

Stang came through the youth system of Lyn and made his senior debut in June 1997. After one season in Eliteserien and one in 1. divisjon, he pursued high education in Trondheim, and played for Byåsen on the second tier.

In the 1999 1. divisjon, Byåsen was deducted points for financial irregularities and looked doomed from the onset. Not finding themselves above the relegation line a single time during the season, Byåsen played a decisive season closer against Skjetten SK. In extra time, Stang secured a goal to give Byåsen a victory and avoid relegation at the cost of FK Lofoten.

In 2004 he appeared for St. Hanshaugen IF. He was later a prolific veteran's football player for Oppegård IL.

References

1977 births
Living people
Footballers from Oslo
Norwegian footballers
Lyn Fotball players
Byåsen Toppfotball players
Association football defenders
Eliteserien players
Norwegian First Division players